The Mayor of Western Bay of Plenty officiates over the Western Bay of Plenty District of New Zealand's North Island.

James Denyer is the current mayor of Western Bay of Plenty. He was elected in 2022.

List of mayors
There have been seven mayors of the Western Bay of Plenty.

References

Western Bay of Plenty
Western Bay of Plenty
Western Bay of Plenty District